Aherahu is about 0.1 ha small islet in the Väinameri Sea in Estonia.

See also
 List of islands of Estonia

References

Estonian islands in the Baltic
Hiiumaa Parish